Mitogen-activated protein kinase scaffold protein 1 is a scaffold protein that in humans is encoded by the MAPKSP1 gene.

Function 

The protein encoded by this gene was identified as an interacting protein that binds specifically to MAP kinase kinase MAP2K1/MEK1 and to MAP kinase MAPK2/ERK1. This protein enhances the activation of MAPK2, and thus is thought to function as an adaptor to enhance the efficiency of the MAP kinase cascade.

Interactions 

MAP2K1IP1 has been shown to interact with MAP2K1.

References

Further reading